Smicrips texana is a species of palmetto beetle in the family Smicripidae. It is found in North America.

References

Further reading

 

Cucujoidea
Articles created by Qbugbot
Beetles described in 1916